Robert Jauch (born November 22, 1945) is a retired American Democratic politician.  He served 28 years in the Wisconsin State Senate (1987–2015) and four years in the State Assembly (1983–1987).  He retired in 2015, citing the increased partisanship in the Legislature.

Background
Born in Wheaton, Illinois, Jauch graduated from Wheaton Central High School and then served in the United States Army 1964–1968. He went to University of Wisconsin–Eau Claire and University of Wisconsin–Superior. He served as field representative for United States Representative David Obey.

Wisconsin legislature

During the protests in Wisconsin, Jauch, along with the 13 other Democratic State Senators, left the state to deny the State Senate a quorum on Governor Scott Walker's controversial "Budget Repair" legislation.

References

External links
Senator Robert Jauch at the Wisconsin State Legislature
constituency site
 
25th Senate District, Senator Jauch in the Wisconsin Blue Book (2005–2006)
49th Assembly District, Assemblyman Jauch in the Wisconsin Blue Book (1983–1984)

Wisconsin state senators
Members of the Wisconsin State Assembly
1945 births
Living people
People from Wheaton, Illinois
University of Wisconsin–Eau Claire alumni
University of Wisconsin–Superior alumni
21st-century American politicians
People from Door County, Wisconsin